was a Japanese politician. He was born in Kagoshima Prefecture. He was governor of Yamagata Prefecture (1897-1898), Ōita Prefecture (1898-1899), Nagano Prefecture (1899-1902), Iwate Prefecture (1904-1907) and Kumamoto Prefecture (1907-1908). He was a member of the Government-General of Taiwan. He was a recipient of the Order of the Rising Sun and the Order of the Sacred Treasure.

References

Bibliography
秦郁彦編『日本近現代人物履歴事典』東京大学出版会、2002年。
歴代知事編纂会編『新編日本の歴代知事』歴代知事編纂会、1991年。
衆議院・参議院編『議会制度百年史 - 貴族院・参議院議員名鑑』1990年。

External links
 [ 八幡製鉄所と押川則吉『歴史写真. 大正7年4月號』]（国立国会図書館デジタルコレクション）

1863 births
1918 deaths
Governors of Yamagata Prefecture
Governors of Ōita
Governors of Nagano
Governors of Iwate Prefecture
Governors of Kumamoto Prefecture
Recipients of the Order of the Rising Sun, 3rd class
Recipients of the Order of the Sacred Treasure, 2nd class
People from Kagoshima Prefecture
Members of the Government-General of Taiwan